Coch or COCH may refer to:
 Cochlin, extracellular matrix protein enriched in the inner ear
 Council of Christian Hospitals, in Andhra Pradesh, India
 Countess of Chester Hospital, in Chester, United Kingdom
 Aleix Coch (born 1991), Spanish footballer
 Jessica Coch (born 1979), Mexican actress

See also